Jacob Lumet Cannavale (born May 1, 1995) is an American actor and musician. He appeared on Broadway in 2015 in the comedy Fish in the Dark by Larry David. He has also appeared on television's Nurse Jackie and The Mandalorian. He is the son of actor Bobby Cannavale and screenwriter Jenny Lumet, a grandson of film director Sidney Lumet, and a great-grandson of singer/actress Lena Horne.

Filmography

Film

Television

Theatre

References

External links

Jake Cannavale on IBDB

1995 births
Living people
21st-century American male actors
American male film actors
American male stage actors
American male television actors
Lumet family
Male actors from New York City
People of Polish-Jewish descent
People of African-American descent
21st-century African-American people